Okeechobee may refer to:

Lake Okeechobee, in Florida, United States
Okeechobee, Florida, United States
Okeechobee County, Florida, United States
Okeechobee Waterway, in Florida, United States
Okeechobee Plain, in Florida, United States
Okeechobee Group, geologic group in Florida, United States
Okeechobee (Metrorail station)
Okeechobee (Amtrak station)
1928 Okeechobee hurricane
Okeechobee Music & Arts Festival, in Florida, United States